The Binagadi asphalt lake (or Binagadi tar pits) are a cluster of tar pits in urban Baku, Azerbaijan.  Asphaltum or tar has seeped up from the ground in this area for tens of thousands of years.  The tar is often covered with dust, leaves, or water.  Over many centuries, animals that were trapped in the tar were preserved as bones.

This ancient flora and fauna deposit is protected by the State as a monument of a nature of the special significance pursuant to the Decree of the Government of Azerbaijan Republic No. 167 of March 16, 1982.

Geography of the area
The Binagady locality is on the crest of a hill 0.5 km southeast of the settlement of Binagady, and 7 km north of Baku. The coast at its closest is 10 km to the south and 25 km to the north. 

The bone-bearing area comprises approximately 1.5 hectares and is located on a hilltop near the Kyrrar hill. The area is 54–57 m above present sea level, and 48 m above the level of Lake Boyukshor. An ancient mud volcano (Kichik-Dag) lies north of the fossiliferous area; further to the north is the meridionally elongated, saline Lake Masazyr (Mirdalyabi) and to the northeast Lake Binagady. To the east is the saline depression Kariatakh-Shor, beyond which rises the Balakhany Plateau. Extending from the Binagady hill are oil-bearing Salinas and the saline Lake Beyuk-Shor, which stretches far to the southeast.

Natural-Historical Museum

The Binagadi fauna and flora deposit has been suggested to be richer by number of Quaternary animal fossil than the Californian La Brea Tar Pits. The Binagadi deposit is important in studying the paleobiology of entire Caucasus, Middle East, and the European part of NIS countries.

Discovery of the first
The locality was discovered in 1938 by a student, Mastan-Zade, who was studying the Apsheron bitumens. The first excavations were organized by Bogachev in 1938 (Azerbaijan branch of the Academy of Sciences of the U.S.S.R.). The excavations continued until 1941 with the participation of Kasabova and Sultanov and were resumed in 1946 under the supervision of Burchak-Abramovich.

References

Sources
 

Asphalt lakes
Geography of Baku
Geology of Azerbaijan
Cenozoic paleontological sites of Asia
Pleistocene
Paleontology in Azerbaijan
World Heritage Tentative List